Hong Kong Senior Challenge Shield 2009–10, officially named as Canbo Senior Shield due to the competition's sponsorship by Guangdong Canbo Electrical, was the 108th season of one of the Asian oldest football knockout competition, Hong Kong Senior Challenge Shield. It was a knockout competition for all the teams of Hong Kong First Division League. The winner South China has guaranteed a place in the 2011 AFC Cup.

Calendar

Teams

Bracket

First round

Quarter-finals

Semi-finals

Final

Scorers
The scorers in the 2009–10 Hong Kong Senior Challenge Shield are as follows:

4 goals
 Chan Siu Ki (South China)

3 goals
 Baruc Nsue (Kitchee)

2 goals
 Lee Hong Lim (TSW Pegasus)
 Ye Jia (NT Realty Wofoo Tai Po)
 Ubay Luzardo (Kitchee)
 Leo (South China)
 Tales Schutz (South China)

1 goal
 Poon Man Tik (Tai Chung)
 Chan Ka Chun (Tai Chung)
 Christian Annan (NT Realty Wofoo Tai Po)
 Detinho (Citizen)

1 goal
 Sandro (Citizen)
 Wong Yiu Fu (Citizen)
 Law Chun Bong (Citizen)
 Fan Weijun (Fourway Rangers)
 Cheng Lai Hin (Kitchee)
 Edson Minga (Kitchee)
 Liang Zicheng (Kitchee)
 Lee Wai Lim (South China)
 Julius Akosah (Sun Hei)
 Cahe (Sun Hei)
 Itaparica (TSW Pegasus)
 Georges-Andre Machia  (TSW Pegasus)
 Luk Koon Pong (TSW Pegasus)

Own goals
 Wong Chun Ho (Happy Valley) (for NT Realty Wofoo Tai Po)

Prizes

External links
HKFA.com - Senior Shield info 2009-2010

Shield
2009-10
2009 domestic association football cups